Odontolamia sellata is a species of beetle in the family Cerambycidae, and the only species in the genus Odontolamia. It was described by Harold in 1879.

References

Lamiinae
Beetles described in 1879